The International Fleetstar is a series of heavy-duty trucks that was produced between 1962 and 1977 by International Harvester.  Slotted above the Loadstar and below the Paystar and Transtar conventionals introduced after it, the Fleetstar was the first truck line that International designed specifically for vocational use. 

Using a conventional-cab configuration, the Fleetstar was available as both a straight truck and as a semitractor, with both single and tandem rear axles.

In 1977, International Harvester introduced the S-Series. Consolidating the Fleetstar and Loadstar within a single model range, the S-Series replaced the Fleetstar first.  The contemporary equivalent of the Fleestar produced by International is the HV (WorkStar).

Models
1900

2000

2010

2010A

2050

2070

2100

The Fleetstar line was larger than the Loadstar (International's medium duty lineup during this time) and smaller than the Paystar (severe service) and Transtar (primarily semi-tractors). Fleetstars used the "C" series cab popular on the Loadstar and pickups, and later on got the newer "D" series cab, with some overlap between the two models. There were Cummins, Detroit Diesel, and International Harvester built engines available in larger sizes than those of the Loadstar line. Frame rail and axle sizes were generally larger than their smaller cousin, and were of the completely straight design for strength. These frames were typical of International truck frames in general, having large flanges, and great strength.

These were simple and straightforward trucks with stubby noses and short turning radius.  Their name is correct in that many were purchased as fleet trucks, and usually lacked the flash and comfort of the more custom Transtar series. These trucks were reliable, easily fixed and maintained, and offered a low cost heavy truck  for those looking in this market area. The construction and heavy duty market also got its version of the Fleetstar with a special Construction package, but these were eclipsed by the smaller Loadstar and larger Paystar series of trucks. Many older Fleetstar trucks got a second lease on life after over the road trucking by being converted to everything from stake beds to van bodies to dump trucks.  Quite a few examples are around with over 1 million miles on the odometer.

Chassis 
All Fleetstars had ladder frames with the same three standard wheelbases, which increased slightly over the years. The exception was early model tandems, which shared their separate wheelbases.

1972-1974 Models

Powertrain 
The Fleetstar series offered a wide range of engines. Most models offered several gasoline engines and a mid-range diesel. 2000 and 2070 models had heavy duty diesels.

Most Fleetstars had five speed transmissions, often with a two speed rear axle, but a six speed automatic was sometimes an option. Heavy duty diesels had vendor transmissions with up to 13 speeds.

 Engines (Highest rated in different truck models.)

Notes

References

Further reading

External links
International Harvester Fleetstar (Internet Movie Cars Database)

International Harvester vehicles